Heimia salicifolia is a species of flowering plant in the Loosestrife family, Lythraceae. It is native to the Americas, ranging from the southwestern United States (Texas and New Mexico) through Mexico and Central America to Argentina. Common names include shrubby yellowcrest, sinicuichi, sun opener, willow-leaf heimia, sini.  The plant has been used for shamanic purposes by native peoples in Central America and Mexico.

Isolated alkaloids
 Vertine, also known as cryogenine, is regarded as the primary bioactive component and is also generally the most abundant constituent of alkaloidal extracts.
 Lyfoline, the second most abundant alkaloid
 Lythrine, the third most abundant alkaloid
 Heimidine, a minor alkaloid
 Lythridine, a minor alkaloid

Spiritual use

Use of H. salicifolia for shamanic purposes by native peoples of Central America and Mexico has been described.  In the method of preparation commonly used, fresh leaves are collected and allowed to wilt. The leaves are put into a cup or jar, cool water is added, and the mixture is placed in the sun to brew and ferment for at least 24 hours. It is said that during the fermentation process, the knowledge of the sun is embedded into the potion, creating the "elixir of the sun."

References

External links

salicifolia
Plants described in 1822
Entheogens
Flora of Argentina
Flora of Bolivia
Flora of Brazil
Flora of Central America
Flora of Mexico
Flora of New Mexico
Flora of Paraguay
Flora of Texas